Dacia was the land inhabited by the Dacians, its core in Transylvania, stretching to the Danube in the south, the Black Sea in the east, and the Tisza in the west. The Carpathian Mountains were located in the middle of Dacia. It thus roughly corresponds to the present-day countries of Romania, as well as parts of Moldova, Bulgaria, Serbia, Hungary, Slovakia, and Ukraine.

A Dacian kingdom of variable size existed between 82 BC until the Roman conquest in AD 106, reaching its height under King Burebista. As a result of the two wars with Emperor Trajan, the population was dispersed and the central city, Sarmizegetusa Regia, was destroyed by the Romans, but was rebuilt by the latter to serve as the capital of the Roman province of Dacia. A group of "Free Dacians," may have remained outside the Roman Empire in the territory of modern-day Northern Romania until the start of the Migration Period.

Nomenclature 

The Dacians are first mentioned in the writings of the Ancient Greeks, in Herodotus (Histories Book IV XCIII: "[Getae] the noblest as well as the most just of all the Thracian tribes") and Thucydides (Peloponnesian Wars, Book II: "[Getae] border on the Scythians and are armed in the same manner, being all mounted archers"). Some historians argue that Daxia (mentioned in 3rd century BC) was the previous home of Indo-Iranian nomads who later came to form the Geto-Dacian people.

Geography 

The extent and location of Dacia varied in its three distinct historical periods (see below):

Periods

1st century BC 
The Dacia of King Burebista (82–44 BC) stretched from the Black Sea to the source of the river Tisza and from the Balkan Mountains to Bohemia. During that period, the Getae and Dacians conquered a wider territory and Dacia extended from the Middle Danube to the Black Sea littoral (between Apollonia and Pontic Olbia) and from the Northern Carpathians to the Balkan Mountains. In 53 BC, Julius Caesar stated that the lands of the Dacians started on the eastern edge of the Hercynian (Black) Forest. After Burebista's death, his kingdom fell apart.

1st century AD 
Strabo, in his Geography written around AD 20, says:

″As for the southern part of Germany beyond the Albis, the portion which is just contiguous to that river is occupied by the Suevi; then immediately adjoining this is the land of the Getae, which, though narrow at first, stretching as it does along the Ister [Danube] on its southern side and on the opposite side along the mountain-side of the Hercynian [Black] Forest (for the land of the Getae also embraces a part of the mountains), afterwards broadens out towards the north as far as the Tyregetae; but I cannot tell the precise boundaries″

On this basis, Lengyel and Radan (1980), Hoddinott (1981) and Mountain (1998) consider that the Geto-Dacians inhabited both sides of the Tisza river prior to the rise of the Celtic Boii, and again after the latter were defeated by the Dacians. The hold of the Dacians between the Danube and Tisza was tenuous. However, the archaeologist Parducz argued a Dacian presence west of the Tisa dating from the time of Burebista. According to Tacitus (AD 56–117) Dacians bordered Germania in the south-east, while Sarmatians bordered it in the east.

In the 1st century AD, the Iazyges settled West of Dacia, on the plain between the Danube and the Tisa rivers, according to the scholars' interpretation of Pliny's text: "The higher parts between the Danube and the Hercynian Forest (Black Forest) as far as the winter quarters of Pannonia at Carnutum and the plains and level country of the German frontiers there are occupied by the Sarmatian Iazyges, while the Dacians whom they have driven out hold the mountains and forests as far as the river Theiss".

2nd century AD 

Written a few decades after Emperor Trajan's Roman conquest of parts of Dacia in AD 105–106, Ptolemy's Geographia included the boundaries of Dacia. According to the scholars' interpretation of Ptolemy (Hrushevskyi 1997, Bunbury 1879, Mocsy 1974, Bărbulescu 2005) Dacia was the region between the rivers Tisza, Danube, upper Dniester, and Siret. Mainstream historians accept this interpretation: Avery (1972) Berenger (1994) Fol (1996) Mountain (1998), Waldman Mason (2006).

Ptolemy also provided a couple of Dacian toponyms in south Poland in the Upper Vistula (Polish: Wisla) river basin: Susudava and Setidava (with a manuscript variant Getidava). This could have been an "echo" of Burebista's expansion. It seems that this northern expansion of the Dacian language, as far as the Vistula river, lasted until AD 170–180 when the migration of the Vandal Hasdingi pushed out this northern Dacian group. This Dacian group, possibly the Costoboci/Lipița culture, is associated by Gudmund Schütte with towns having the specific Dacian language ending "dava" i.e. Setidava.

The Roman province Dacia Traiana, established by the victors of the Dacian Wars during AD 101–106, initially comprised only the regions known today as Banat, Oltenia, Transylvania, and was subsequently gradually extended to southern parts of Moldavia, while Dobruja and Budjak belonged to the Roman province of Moesia.

In the 2nd century AD, after the Roman conquest, Ptolemy puts the eastern boundary of Dacia Traiana (the Roman province) as far east as the Hierasus (Siret) river, in the middle of modern Romania. Roman rule extended to the south-western area of the Dacian Kingdom (but not to what later became known as Maramureş), to parts of the later Principality of Moldavia east of the Siret and north of the Upper Trajan Wall, and to areas in modern Muntenia and Ukraine, except the Black Sea shore.

After the Marcomannic Wars (AD 166–180), Dacian groups from outside Roman Dacia had been set in motion. So were the 12,000 Dacians "from the neighbourhood of Roman Dacia sent away from their own country". Their native country could have been the Upper Tisa region, but other places cannot be excluded.

The later Roman province Dacia Aureliana, was organized inside former Moesia Superior after the retreat of the Roman army from Dacia, during the reign of emperor Aurelian during AD 271–275. It was reorganized as Dacia Ripensis (as a military province) and Dacia Mediterranea (as a civil province).

Cities 

Ptolemy gives a list of 43 names of towns in Dacia, out of which arguably 33 were of Dacian origin. Most of the latter included the added suffix "dava" (meaning settlement, village). But, other Dacian names from his list lack the suffix (e.g. Zarmisegethusa regia = Zermizirga). In addition, nine other names of Dacian origin seem to have been Latinised.

The cities of the Dacians were known as -dava, -deva, -δαυα ("-dawa" or "-dava", Anc. Gk.), -δεβα ("-deva", Byz. Gk.) or -δαβα ("-dava", Byz. Gk.), etc. .

In Dacia: Acidava, Argedava, Buridava, Dokidava, Carsidava, Clepidava, Cumidava, Marcodava, Netindava, Patridava, Pelendava, *Perburidava, Petrodaua, Piroboridaua, Rhamidaua, Rusidava, Sacidava, Sangidava, Setidava, Singidava, Tamasidava, Utidava, Zargidava, Ziridava, Sucidava26 names altogether.
 In Lower Moesia (the present Northern Bulgaria) and Scythia minor (Dobrudja): Aedeba, *Buteridava, *Giridava, Dausadava, Kapidaua, Murideba, Sacidava, Scaidava (Skedeba), Sagadava, Sukidaua (Sucidava)10 names in total.
In Upper Moesia (the districts of Nish, Sofia, and partly Kjustendil): Aiadaba, Bregedaba, Danedebai, Desudaba, Itadeba, Kuimedaba, Zisnudebaseven names in total.

Gil-doba, a village in Thracia, of unknown location.

Thermi-daua, a town in Dalmatia. Probably a Grecized form of *Germidava.

Pulpu-deva, (Phillipopolis) today Plovdiv in Bulgaria.

Political entities

Rubobostes 

Geto-Dacians inhabited both sides of the Tisa river prior to the rise of the Celtic Boii and again after the latter were defeated by the Dacians under the king Burebista. It seems likely that the Dacian state arose as a tribal confederacy, which was united only by charismatic leadership in both military-political and ideological-religious domains. At the beginning of the 2nd century BC, under the rule of Rubobostes, a Dacian king in present-day Transylvania, the Dacians' power in the Carpathian basin increased after they defeated the Celts, who previously held power in the region.

Oroles 

A kingdom of Dacia also existed as early as the first half of the 2nd century BC under King Oroles. Conflicts with the Bastarnae and the Romans (112–109 BC, 74 BC), against whom they had assisted the Scordisci and Dardani, greatly weakened the resources of the Dacians.

Burebista 

Burebista (Boerebista), a contemporary of Julius Caesar, ruled Geto-Dacian tribes between 82 BC and 44 BC. He thoroughly reorganised the army and attempted to raise the moral standard and obedience of the people by persuading them to cut their vines and give up drinking wine. During his reign, the limits of the Dacian Kingdom were extended to their maximum. The Bastarnae and Boii were conquered, and even the Greek towns of Olbia and Apollonia on the Black Sea (Pontus Euxinus) recognized Burebista's authority. In 53 BC, Caesar stated that the Dacian territory was on the eastern border of the Hercynian Forest.

Burebista suppressed the indigenous minting of coinages by four major tribal groups, adopting imported or copied Roman denarii as a monetary standard. During his reign, Burebista transferred Geto-Dacians capital from Argedava to Sarmizegetusa Regia. For at least one and a half centuries, Sarmizegetusa was the Dacians' capital and reached its peak under King Decebalus. The Dacians appeared so formidable that Caesar contemplated an expedition against them, which his death in 44 BC prevented. In the same year, Burebista was murdered, and the kingdom was divided into four (later five) parts under separate rulers.

Cotiso 

One of these entities was Cotiso's state, to whom Augustus betrothed his own five-year-old daughter Julia. He is well known from the line in Horace (Occidit Daci Cotisonis agmen, Odes, III. 8. 18).

The Dacians are often mentioned under Augustus, according to whom they were compelled to recognize Roman supremacy. However they were by no means subdued, and in later times to maintain their independence they seized every opportunity to cross the frozen Danube during the winter and ravaging the Roman cities in the province of Moesia, which was under Roman occupation.

Strabo testified: "although the Getae and Daci once attained to very great power, so that they actually could send forth an expedition of two hundred thousand men, they now find themselves reduced to as few as forty thousand, and they have come close to the point of yielding obedience to the Romans, though as yet they are not absolutely submissive, because of the hopes which they base on the Germans, who are enemies to the Romans."

In fact, this occurred because Burebista's empire split after his death into four and later five smaller states, as Strabo explains, "only recently, when Augustus Caesar sent an expedition against them, the number of parts into which the empire had been divided was five, though at the time of the insurrection it had been four. Such divisions, to be sure, are only temporary and vary with the times".

Decebalus 

Decebalus ruled the Dacians between AD 87 and 106. The frontiers of Decebal's Dacia were marked by the Tisa River to the west, by the trans-Carpathians to the north and by the Dniester River to the east. His name translates into "strong as ten men".

Roman conquest 

When Trajan turned his attention to Dacia, it had been on the Roman agenda since before the days of Julius Caesar when a Roman army had been beaten at the Battle of Histria.

From AD 85 to 89, the Dacians under Decebalus were engaged in two wars with the Romans.

In AD 85, the Dacians had swarmed over the Danube and pillaged Moesia. In AD 87, the Roman troops sent by the Emperor Domitian against them under Cornelius Fuscus, were defeated and Cornelius Fuscus was killed by the Dacians by authority of their ruler, Diurpaneus. After this victory, Diurpaneus took the name of Decebalus, but the Romans were victorious in the Battle of Tapae in AD 88 and a truce was drawn up. The next year, AD 88, new Roman troops under Tettius Julianus, gained a significant advantage, but were obligated to make peace following the defeat of Domitian by the Marcomanni, leaving the Dacians effectively independent. Decebalus was given the status of "king client to Rome", receiving military instructors, craftsmen and money from Rome. To Rome, Domitian brought Italian peasants in Dacian clothing because he couldn't take slaves in the war.

To increase the glory of his reign, restore the finances of Rome, and end a treaty perceived as humiliating, Trajan resolved on the conquest of Dacia, the capture of the famous Treasure of Decebalus, and control over the Dacian gold mines of Transylvania. The result of his first campaign (101–102) was the siege of the Dacian capital Sarmizegethusa and the occupation of part of the country. Emperor Trajan recommenced hostilities against Dacia and, following an uncertain number of battles, and with Trajan's troops pressing towards the Dacian capital Sarmizegethusa, Decebalus once more sought terms.

Decebalus rebuilt his power over the following years and attacked Roman garrisons again in AD 105. In response Trajan again marched into Dacia, attacking the Dacian capital in the Siege of Sarmizegethusa, and razing it to the ground; the defeated Dacian king Decebalus committed suicide to avoid capture. With part of Dacia quelled as the Roman province Dacia Traiana. Trajan subsequently invaded the Parthian empire to the east. His conquests brought the Roman Empire to its greatest extent. Rome's borders in the east were governed indirectly in this period, through a system of client states, which led to less direct campaigning than in the west.

Some of the history of the war is given by Cassius Dio. Trajan erected the Column of Trajan in Rome to commemorate his victory.

Provincial history
Although the Romans conquered and destroyed the ancient Kingdom of Dacia, a large remainder of the land remained outside of Roman Imperial authority. Additionally, the conquest changed the balance of power in the region and was the catalyst for a renewed alliance of Germanic and Celtic tribes and kingdoms against the Roman Empire. However, the material advantages of the Roman Imperial system was attractive to the surviving aristocracy. Afterwards, many of the Dacians became Romanised (see also Origin of Romanians). In AD 183, war broke out in Dacia: few details are available, but it appears two future contenders for the throne of emperor Commodus, Clodius Albinus and Pescennius Niger, both distinguished themselves in the campaign.

According to Lactantius, the Roman emperor Decius (AD 249–251) had to restore Roman Dacia from the Carpo-Dacians of Zosimus "having undertaken an expedition against the Carpi, who had then possessed themselves of Dacia and Moesia".

Even so, the Germanic and Celtic kingdoms, particularly the Gothic tribes, slowly moved toward the Dacian borders, and within a generation were making assaults on the province. Ultimately, the Goths succeeded in dislodging the Romans and restoring the "independence" of Dacia following Emperor Aurelian's withdrawal, in 275.

In AD 268–269, at Naissus, Claudius II (Gothicus Maximus) obtained a decisive victory over the Goths. Since at that time Romans were still occupying Roman Dacia it is assumed that the Goths didn't cross the Danube from the Roman province. The Goths who survived their defeat didn't even attempt to escape through Dacia, but through Thrace. At the boundaries of Roman Dacia, Carpi (Free Dacians) were still strong enough to sustain five battles in eight years against the Romans from AD 301–308. Roman Dacia was left in AD 275 by the Romans, to the Carpi again, and not to the Goths. There were still Dacians in AD 336, against whom Constantine the Great fought.

The province was abandoned by Roman troops, and, according to the Breviarium historiae Romanae by Eutropius, Roman citizens "from the towns and lands of Dacia" were resettled to the interior of Moesia. Under Diocletian, c. AD 296, in order to defend the Roman border, fortifications were erected by the Romans on both banks of the Danube.

Constantinian reconquest 

In 328 the emperor Constantine the Great inaugurated the Constantine's Bridge (Danube) at Sucidava, (today Celei in Romania) in hopes of reconquering Dacia, a province that had been abandoned under Aurelian. In the late winter of 332, Constantine campaigned with the Sarmatians against the Goths. The weather and lack of food cost the Goths dearly: reportedly, nearly one hundred thousand died before they submitted to Rome. In celebration of this victory Constantine took the title Gothicus Maximus and claimed the subjugated territory as the new province of Gothia. In 334, after Sarmatian commoners had overthrown their leaders, Constantine led a campaign against the tribe. He won a victory in the war and extended his control over the region, as remains of camps and fortifications in the region indicate. Constantine resettled some Sarmatian exiles as farmers in Illyrian and Roman districts, and conscripted the rest into the army. The new frontier in Dacia was along the Brazda lui Novac line supported by Castra of Hinova, Rusidava and Castra of Pietroasele. The limes passed to the north of Castra of Tirighina-Bărboși and ended at Sasyk Lagoon near the Dniester River. Constantine took the title Dacicus maximus in 336. Some Roman territories north of the Danube resisted until Justinian.

Dacia after the Romans 

Victohali, Taifals, and Thervingians are tribes mentioned for inhabiting Dacia in 350, after the Romans left. Archeological evidence suggests that Gepids were disputing Transylvania with Taifals and Tervingians. Taifals, once independent from Gothia became federati of the Romans, from whom they obtained the right to settle Oltenia.

In 376 the region was conquered by Huns, who kept it until the death of Attila in 453. The Gepid tribe, ruled by Ardaric, used it as their base, until in 566 it was destroyed by Lombards. Lombards abandoned the country and the Avars (second half of the 6th century) dominated the region for 230 years, until their kingdom was destroyed by Charlemagne in 791. At the same time, Slavic people arrived.

See also 

 Dacians
 Dacian warfare
 Falx (weapon)
 List of Dacian kings
 List of Dacian cities
 List of Dacian tribes
 Getae
 Carpians
 Costoboci
 Dacian bracelets
 Dacian Draco
 Dacian language
 List of Dacian names
 List of Dacian plant names
 Trajan's Column
 Trajan's Bridge

Notes

References 

 

 

 
 
 

 
 
 
 

 
 Hoddinott, Ralph F., The Thracians, 1981.

External links 

 Sorin Olteanu's Thraco-Daco-Moesian Languages Project (SoLTDM) (sources, thesaurus, textual criticism, phonetics and morphology, substratum, historical geography a.o.)
 Dacia – The historic region in East-Central Europe (includes Roman Castra)
 Ptolemy's Geography, book III, chapter 5
 UNRV Dacia article
 sights.seindal.dk – Dacians as they appear on the Arch of Constantine
 www.fectio.org.uk – Draco Late Roman military standard
 www.stoa.org/trajan – Dacian Wars on Trajan's Column
 Journey to the Land of the Cloud Rovers – photographic slide show of Sarmizegetusa.
 Dacian history
 Dacia on coins.
 Dacian coins

 
82 BC
80s BC establishments
1st century BC
1st century
Dacia
Former monarchies of Europe
Muntenia
States and territories established in the 1st century BC
States and territories disestablished in the 2nd century